Chase County is the name of two counties in the United States:

 Chase County, Kansas 
 Chase County, Nebraska